The 1932 Miami Hurricanes football team represented the University of Miami as a member of the Southern Intercollegiate Athletic Association (SIAA) in the 1932 college football season. The Hurricanes played their home games at Moore Park in Miami, Florida. Led by second-year head coach Tom McCann, the Hurricanes finished their season 4–3–1 and were invited to the first annual edition of the Festival of Palms Bowl, where they defeated  the Manhattan Jaspers by a score of 7–0.

Schedule

References

Miami
Miami Hurricanes football seasons
Miami Hurricanes football